Tony McLoughlin (born 19 January 1949) is a former Irish Fine Gael politician who served as a Teachta Dála (TD) for the Sligo–Leitrim constituency from 2011 to 2020. 

He was elected to Sligo County Council in 1974 and was subsequently elected to Sligo Borough Council in 1979, in place of his father Pat. He has served four separate terms as Mayor of Sligo.

McLoughlin is a nephew of Joseph McLoughlin, who was a Fine Gael TD for the Sligo–Leitrim constituency from 1961 to 1977.

In 2017, McLoughlin's Private Members Legislation to provide for the prohibition of the exploration and extraction of petroleum from shale rock, tight sands and coal seams in the Irish onshore and Ireland's internal waters was enacted and the process otherwise known as Fracking was banned in Ireland. 

In June 2018, McLoughlin announced that he would not be contesting the next general election.

See also
Families in the Oireachtas

References

External links
Tony McLoughlin's page on the Fine Gael website

1949 births
Living people
Fine Gael TDs
Local councillors in County Sligo
Mayors of places in the Republic of Ireland
Members of the 31st Dáil
Members of the 32nd Dáil
People from Sligo (town)
Politicians from County Sligo